Lucien "Lulu" Gamblin (22 July 1890 – 30 August 1972) was a French international footballer played as a midfielder. He spent his entire career playing for Red Star FC and captained the team to three straight Coupe de France titles from 1921–1923. Gamblin was also a France international and made his debut with the team on 23 April 1911 in a 5–2 defeat to Switzerland. His international career was put on hold due to World War I. Following the war's conclusion, Gamblin captained the team in his final nine appearances. After retiring from football in 1923, he became a sports journalist working for such newspapers as L'Auto and France Football.

References 

1890 births
1972 deaths
Association football midfielders
French footballers
France international footballers
Red Star F.C. players
French sports journalists
French male non-fiction writers
20th-century French male writers